Tomb KV8, located in the Valley of the Kings, was used for the burial of Pharaoh Merenptah of Ancient Egypt's Nineteenth Dynasty.

The burial chamber, located at the end of 160 metres of corridor, originally held a set of four nested sarcophagi. The outer one of these was so voluminous that parts of the corridor had to have their doorjambs demolished and rebuilt to allow it to be brought in. These jambs were then rebuilt with the help of inscribed sandstone blocks which were then fixed into place with dovetail cramps. 

The pillars in Chamber F were removed to allow passage of the sarcophagus, only two were replaced. The other two pillars may have been stolen by Paneb, a worker in the craftsman's village (Deir el-Medina), for use in his own tomb.

References
 Reeves, N & Wilkinson, R.H. The Complete Valley of the Kings, 1996, Thames and Hudson, London
 Siliotti, A. Guide to the Valley of the Kings and to the Theban Necropolises and Temples, 1996, A.A. Gaddis, Cairo

External links

Theban Mapping Project: KV8: Includes description, images and plans of the tomb.

KV8 (Tomb of Merenptah) – Tomb Plan, tomb photographs with detailed descriptions and elements that can be inspected. Web Archive Saved on 10 September 2020

Buildings and structures completed in the 13th century BC
Valley of the Kings